Pseudolabrus miles, the scarlet wrasse, is a species of wrasse endemic to the waters around New Zealand.

References

Pseudolabrus
Fish described in 1801
Taxa named by Johann Reinhold Forster